Nikoloz Basilashvili won the title, defeating Lukáš Lacko in the final, 4–6, 6–4, 6–3.

Seeds

Draw

Finals

Top half

Bottom half

References
 Main Draw
 Qualifying Draw

Electra Israel Open - Singles
Israel Open